The 2001 AFL Women's National Championships took place in Brisbane, Queensland, Australia. The tournament began on 29 June and ended on 4 July 2001. The 2001 tournament was the 10th Championship. The Senior-vics of Victoria won the 2001 Championship, defeating Queensland in the final. It was Victoria's 10th consecutive title.

Ladder
  Victoria-Senior
  Queensland
  Western Australia
  Australian Capital Territory
  Northern Territory
  Australian Capital Territory
  South Australia
  New South Wales

External links
National Results from the AFL site

2001
2001 in Australian rules football
AFL